Andrew Cohen (born October 23, 1955) is an American spiritual teacher. He is an author, former editor of What Is Enlightenment? magazine, and founder of the global spiritual community EnlightenNext, which dissolved in 2013.

Biography and beliefs
Cohen was born in New York City into an upper-middle class secular Jewish family. Cohen recounts that his life was changed by a spontaneous experience of "cosmic consciousness" at the age of sixteen. At 22 years of age and after pursuing a career as a jazz musician, he began a quest to recover his earlier spiritual experience. He eventually met H. W. L. Poonja in 1986, a student of Ramana Maharshi, who taught that no mind effort is needed to attain enlightenment "because it is merely the realisation of what one already has". At their first meeting, Cohen realized that he "had always been free". He claimed that Poonja declared him his heir, so Cohen began to teach as a neo-Advaita teacher, and gathered a community around him. However Cohen only spent a short time in the presence of H. W. L. Poonja, who later claimed never to have given Cohen permission to give spiritual teachings. 

Within a few years, Cohen considered that the ecstatic experiences his students had in his presence were limited. Being convinced that he himself was fully free from karmic bondage, he began to demand more commitment from his students, insisting on complete "ego-transcendence". This change in teaching-style led to dissent and a break with Poonja, who Cohen felt had ethical and enlightened behavioral shortcomings.

According to Cohen, "Poonja insisted that the realization of the Self had nothing to do with worldly behavior, and he did not believe fully transcending the ego was possible." According to Poonja, "Karmic tendencies remained after enlightenment, [but] the enlightened person was no longer identified with them and, therefore, did not accrue further karmic consequences." For Poonja, ethical standards were based on an understanding of duality and the notion of an individual agent, and were therefore not representative of Advaita: "For Poonja, the goal was the realisation of the self; the illusory realm of relative reality was ultimately irrelevant." Cohen did not agree, insisting instead on "flawless behavior" as the manifestation of enlightenment.

In 1991, Cohen founded EnlightenNext magazine (under its former title, What Is Enlightenment?), which "established him as a major contemporary spiritual figure." In 2004, EnlightenNext magazine partnered with the Graduate Institute in Connecticut to offer a master's program in conscious evolution. From 2004 to 2007, Cohen served as a core faculty of that institute. The magazine stopped publishing in 2011.

After the break with Poonja, Cohen's teachings were further developed into "Evolutionary Enlightenment", aiming at an impersonal enlightenment which transcends the personal. Yet, the change in teaching-style led also to "physical force, verbal abuse, and intense psychological pressure against students." The growing complaints from students have been described in several publications from former students and from his own mother.

In 2001, Cohen co-formed the jazz-funk-fusion band Unfulfilled Desires, in which he played drums. The band played original compositions and standards, and performed in Europe and the United States. They released four CDs: Live at the Iron Horse (2002), Enlightened Dog (2004), Punk Funk (2008), and Plugged (2010).

On June 26, 2013, Cohen announced on his blog that he would be taking "a sabbatical for an extended period of time", after confrontational exchanges with some of his closest students, who helped Cohen to realize, as he put it, that "in spite of the depth of my awakening, my ego is still alive and well".

On May 12, 2015, Cohen posted an extensive apology letter to his former students on his blog, his first writing after emerging from a two-year sabbatical. In it he wrote about the need to embrace the spiritual principle of agape, as well as eros, and expressed regret for the ways in which his lack of the former in his teaching methods hurt and alienated many former students.

In September 2016, after over three years' absence from public life, Cohen unveiled a redesigned website. This included an announcement of his intention to return to formal teaching, beginning with a retreat planned for early 2017.

In 2020 Cohen launched Manifest Nirvana, an online meditation and teaching platform that is described on the homepage as a "Home for Sovereign Souls, Radical Spirits and Integral Pioneers".

Teachings

Influences
When beginning to teach, Cohen was influenced by H. W. L. Poonja, who offered a "deinstitutionalized and experiential Advaita," comparable to Ramana Maharshi's teachings, which differ from the traditional Advaita Vedanta of Shankara.  He likewise credits the "integral philosopher" Ken Wilber, with whom he conducts frequent public discourses, with helping him form the theoretical framework of his teachings. He has also been influenced by the Spiral Dynamics theories put forward by Don Beck as an extension of the emergent cyclical theory of Clare Graves. Cohen was also inspired by Swami Krishnananda of the Divine Life Society in India, and his call "In unity there is strength; come together, come together."

Evolutionary Enlightenment
According to Cohen, "traditional" enlightenment is the realisation of the transcendental aspect of God, and it often goes hand in hand with the realization that the world is an illusion.

Cohen says that he has discovered a different form of "enlightened awareness," which he claims to be unique. He first called this "impersonal enlightenment" to reflect the fact that it was a realization shared between people rather than an individual attainment. He later changed the name to Evolutionary Enlightenment, both to reflect his belief that it indicates the next stage of the evolution of enlightenment and to convey the creative, world-embracing vision of spiritual awakening as an unending process of individual and cultural development.

A fundamental aspect of Cohen's Evolutionary Enlightenment is the distinction between what he sees as two fundamental, yet opposing, aspects of the human psyche: the "ego" and the "authentic self", In his teaching, ego is defined as "the deeply ingrained, compulsive need to remain separate and superior at all times, in all places, under all circumstances." The authentic self, on the other hand, is defined as "the urge to become more conscious".

According to Cohen and Wilber, "enlightenment" does not refer to an unchanging state, but has to be in accord with an ongoing evolution of humanity, which is the "Authentic Self." According to Cohen, individuals need to recognize that their own spiritual transformation is essential for cultural evolution. To achieve that, in Cohen's view, an individual should strive to realize his or her true self as being "one with the timeless Ground of all Being and with the evolutionary impulse that is driving the entire cosmos."

According to Wilber, evolutionary enlightenment means "the realization of oneness with all states and all stages that have evolved so far and that are in existence at any given time." Cohen believes that individuals need to transcend egoism to express the "Authentic Self." Through identifying the evolutionary impulse as their own Authentic Self, individuals can transcend ego, and find a deeper self-sense without relying on asceticism or solitude.

Cohen's ideas are co-inspired by Wilber's Integral Theory, offering an integral vision of the integral evolution of matter and consciousness. According to this theory, human development parallels the evolution of all being.

Award
In May 2013, Watkins Books listed Cohen at Number 28 on their "Spiritual 100" list for 2012.

Controversy
H. W. L. Poonja, also known as Papaji, the Indian Guru who Cohen claims called him his "heir" stated publicly that Cohen only spent 25 hours in satsang before proclaiming himself as enlightened. Papaji describes Cohen's claims as the arrogance of his ego and never acknowledged Cohen as a master or heir, but rather described him as a messenger. The mental, physical, and financial abuse Cohen perpetrated against former students, which he justifies as "crazy wisdom" are documented in books such as American Guru, Enlightenment Blues,  and Mother of God, as well as popular blogs such as What Enlightenment? and EnlightenNixt.

Poonja himself has been sharply criticized for too easily authorising students to teach:

Some of Cohen's former followers, including his mother, Luna Tarlo, have viewed him as a manipulative spiritual teacher. Tarlo wrote a critical book, called Mother of God, about her experience as one of his disciples. In a Psychology Today article, published in 1998 entitled "Crimes of the Soul", Tarlo recounted how she became a disciple of her son who told her "to give way to him or their relationship would end" and forbade her "to express an opinion on anything". Tarlo said she "knew if I seriously objected to anything, I'd be kicked out" and stated that her son, formerly the "sweetest, sensitive kid, had changed into an unrecognizable tyrant."

André van der Braak's Enlightenment Blues: My Years with an American Guru alleges that Cohen demanded large sums of money and extreme and unquestioning devotion from his students.

American Guru: A Story of Love, Betrayal and Healing, by William Yenner and other former Cohen student contributors (foreword by Stephen Batchelor), allege authoritarianism, financial manipulation, physical and psychological abuse in Cohen's community, and discusses the challenges of healing after leaving the community.

Over the years, there were many indications that Cohen's group was in difficult financial straits. In 2011 it officially ended publication of its magazine EnlightenNext. In the summer of 2013, Cohen was accused of being a cult leader.  As of early 2014, the EnlightenNext organization's main building on its property in Lenox, Massachusetts, which had been on the market for years, remained up for sale.

In 2016, over 240 of Cohen's former students signed an online petition titled "Stop Andrew Cohen teaching again", including detailed explanations of why they believe him to be unfit to teach others.

Works
Cohen has written for The Huffington Post Big Think, and Speaking Tree,

Bibliography
My Master Is My Self (1989), 
Enlightenment Is a Secret (1991), 
Autobiography of An Awakening (1992), 
An Unconditional Relationship to Life (1995), 
The Challenge of Enlightenment (1996), 
In Defense of the Guru Principle  (1999), 
Freedom Has No History (1997), 
Who Am I? and How Shall I Live? (1998), 
Embracing Heaven & Earth (2000), 
Living Enlightenment: A Call for Evolution Beyond Ego (2002), 
Evolutionary Enlightenment: A New Path to Spiritual Awakening (2011), 
When Shadow Meets the Bodhisattva (2023),

See also
 Integral theory (Ken Wilber)

Notes

References

Sources

Printed sources

Primary
 
 
 
 
 
 
 
 
 

Secondary

Web-sources

External links 

 Manifest Nirvana, Andrew Cohen's new online venue
 Integral Abuse, Andrew Cohen and the Culture of Evolutionary Enlightenment
 spiritualteachers.org, Andrew Cohen
 The Atlantic (2016), Holy shit, we're in a cult! profile on Cohen and his former followers

1955 births
American spiritual teachers
American spiritual writers
Integral thought
Living people
Neo-Advaita teachers
Spiritual teachers